Maurício Poggi Villela, commonly known as Mauricinho (born 29 December 1963) is a former football striker who played professionally in Brazil, Japan, Portugal and Spain.

Career
Born in Ribeirão Preto, Mauricinho began playing football with local side Comercial Futebol Clube. He appeared in more than 100 Campeonato Brasileiro matches while playing for CR Vasco da Gama, Clube Atlético Bragantino, Clube do Remo and Botafogo de Futebol e Regatas.

In September 1989, Mauricinho signed with RCD Espanyol, where he would only make four Segunda División appearances before the club released him in December 1989.

Mauricinho played for the Brazil team which won the 1983 FIFA World Youth Championship in Mexico. He was named in the team of the tournament. Later that year, Mauricinho made an appearance for Brazil at the 1983 Pan American Games.

References

External links
Profile at Foradejogo.net

1963 births
Living people
Brazilian footballers
Comercial Futebol Clube (Ribeirão Preto) players
CR Vasco da Gama players
Sociedade Esportiva Palmeiras players
Clube Atlético Bragantino players
Clube do Remo players
Associação Atlética Ponte Preta players
Botafogo de Futebol e Regatas players
RCD Espanyol footballers
Kyoto Sanga FC players
Association football forwards
Footballers from São Paulo (state)
Pan American Games silver medalists for Brazil
Medalists at the 1983 Pan American Games
Footballers at the 1983 Pan American Games
Pan American Games medalists in football